The whistling ducks or tree ducks are a subfamily, Dendrocygninae, of the duck, goose and swan family of birds, Anatidae. In other taxonomic schemes, they are considered a separate family, Dendrocygnidae.  Some taxonomists list only  one genus, Dendrocygna, which contains eight living species, and one undescribed extinct species from Aitutaki of the Cook Islands, but other taxonomists also list the white-backed duck (Thalassornis leuconotus) under the subfamily.

Taxonomy and evolution 
Whistling ducks were first described by Carl Linnaeus in the 10th edition of Systema Naturae in 1758: the black-bellied whistling duck (then Anas autumnalis) and the West Indian whistling duck (then Anas arborea).  In 1837, William John Swainson named the genus Dendrocygna to distinguish whistling ducks from the other waterfowl. The type species was listed as the wandering whistling duck (D. arcuata), formerly named by Thomas Horsfield as Anas arcuata.

Whistling duck taxonomy, including that of the entire order Anseriformes, is complicated and disputed.  Under a traditional classification proposed by ornithologist Jean Théodore Delacour based on morphological and behavioral traits, whistling ducks belong to the tribe Dendrocygnini under the family Anatidae and subfamily Anserinae.  Following the revisions by ornithologist Paul Johnsgard, Dendrocygnini includes the genus Thalassornis (the white-backed duck) under this system.

In 1997, Bradley C. Livezey proposed that Dendrocygna were a separate lineage from Anserinae, placing it and its tribe in its own subfamily, Dendrocygninae. Alternatively Charles Sibley and Jon Edward Ahlquist recommended placing Dendrocygna in its own family, Dendrocygnidae, which includes the genus Thalassornis.

Species 
Eight species of whistling duck are currently recognized in the genus Dendrocygna.  However, Johnsgard considers the white-backed duck (Thalassornis leuconotus) from Africa and Madagascar to be distinct ninth species, a view first proposed in 1960 and initially supported by behavioral similarities.  Later, similarities in anatomy, duckling vocalizations, and feather proteins gave additional support.  Molecular analysis in 2009 also suggested that the white-backed duck was nested within the whistling duck clade.  In addition to the extant species, subfossil remains of an extinct, undescribed species have been found on Aitutaki of the Cook Islands.

Description 
Whistling ducks are found in the tropics and subtropics.  As their name implies, they have distinctive whistling calls.

The whistling ducks have long legs and necks, and are very gregarious, flying to and from night-time roosts in large flocks. Both sexes have the same plumage, and all have a hunched appearance and black underwings in flight.

Notes

References

Literature cited

External links 
 

Bird genera